The 2006 Acropolis Rally was the eighth round of the 2006 World Rally Championship season. It took place between June 1–4, 2006.

Results

Special Stages
All dates and times are EEST (UTC+3).

External links
 Results at eWRC.com
 Results at Jonkka's World Rally Archive

Acropolis Rally, 2006
Acropolis Rally
Acropolis